RV Rachel Carson is a research vessel owned and operated by the University of Maryland's Center for Environmental Science, named in honor of the marine biologist and writer Rachel Carson.

The 81-foot aluminum-hulled vessel is an extended and modified Challenger class fast research vessel, designed by marine architect Roger Long.  It is equipped with twin 1,200 horsepower diesel engines and water jet drives which give a maximum speed of 24 knots. A dynamic positioning system automatically maintains the vessel's position.

The ship was built by Hike Metal Products of Wheatley, Ontario, at a cost of $4.6 million, and christened by Katie O'Malley on November 16, 2008, at Annapolis.

The Rachel Carson has operated in Chesapeake Bay since early 2009, teaching estuarine sampling techniques, carrying out water quality surveys, plankton collection, box coring operations, and deploying instrument packages.

References

2008 ships
Environmental science
Research vessels of the United States
Ships built in Ontario
University of Maryland, College Park
RV 2008